Birling may refer to:

Places in the United Kingdom 
Birling, Kent
Birling, Northumberland
Birling Gap, Sussex

Other uses 
Birling (sport), also known as logrolling
Birling family, in An Inspector Calls

See also 
 Birlingham, Worcestershire